Honorary citizen of Niš is a title awarded by the leadership of Niš on behalf of the city.

Requirements
The title can be awarded to both a citizen of Serbia and any other state, as a politician or statesman, as well as a representative of a non-governmental organization or an artist. A candidate for honorary citizenship of Niš must have a contribution to the development of science, art, humanitarian activities, etc., which has helped the development and image of Niš, the development of democracy in Serbia and the world. The decision to award the title is made by the City Assembly.

History
The first honorary citizen of Niš was King Milan I Obrenović due to his liberation of Niš from Turkish rule. The historical archive does not possess a document on when exactly King Milan was declared an honorary citizen, but there are documents from which this information is indirectly obtained. The second honorary citizen was Thomas Lipton some time after 1915.

The year of 2000 is when the title was officially established in modern times by the Assembly of Niš.

Since 2000, the title of honorary citizen of Niš was given most to humanitarians from Greece.

List of honorary citizens
The list includes people who have been awarded the title of honorary citizen of Niš.

See also
List of honorary citizens of Belgrade
List of honorary citizens of Novi Sad
List of honorary citizens of Zrenjanin

References 

Niš

Niš-related lists
Honorary citizens of Niš